Filatima shastaella is a moth of the family Gelechiidae. It is found in North America, where it has been recorded from California.

References

Moths described in 1937
Filatima